Aa riobambae is a species of orchid in the genus Aa.

It is native to Ecuador, where it grows at altitudes of 3,300 to 3,800 meters.

References

riobambae
Plants described in 1921
Endemic flora of Ecuador